Sleater may refer to:

 Lou Sleater (1926–2013), Major League Baseball pitcher 
 Sleater-Kinney, musical act

See also
 Slater